List of prominent alumni and faculty of the University of South Dakota School of Law.

Academia

Attorneys General

Business

Governors and Lieutenant Governors

State Supreme Court Justices

United States District Attorneys

United States District Court

United States Court of Appeals

United States House of Representatives

United States Tax Court

United States Senate

United States Military

State Legislature
William Garner Waddel (1904), Member of South Dakota Senate
Roswell Bottum (1924), Member of South Dakota House of Representatives 
Donald A. Haggar, Member of South Dakota House of Representatives 
Scott Heidepriem (1980), Minority Leader of South Dakota Senate.
Anne Hajek, Member of South Dakota House of Representatives
Marc Feinstein (1995), Member of South Dakota House of Representatives
Lance Russell (2000), Member of South Dakota House of Representatives
Craig Kennedy, Member of South Dakota Senate
Joni Cutler, Member of South Dakota House of Representatives
Ervin E. Dupper, Member of South Dakota Senate
Ron J. Volesky, Member of South Dakota Senate
Timothy Johns, Member of South Dakota House of Representatives
Roger W. Hunt, Member of South Dakota House of Representatives
Margaret V. Gillespie, Member of South Dakota House of Representatives
Mike Stevens, Member of South Dakota House of Representatives
Brian Gosch (1996), current Majority Leader and former Speaker of the House of South Dakota House of Representatives.
David Lust (1997), Majority Leader of South Dakota House of Representatives.

Tribal, Sovereign, Foreign Courts

Creighton Leland Robertson (1976), Chief Judge of the Sisseton Wapheton Oyate Reservation Tribal Court
Charles Abourezk (1992), current Chief Justice of the Rosebud Sioux Tribe Supreme Court, 2014–present.

Noted Faculty

Current
Frank Pommersheim, American Indian Law Professor, Camden 28 member, Chief Judge for the Cheyenne River Sioux Tribal Court of Appeals and the Chief Justice of the Rosebud Sioux Supreme Court
Patrick Garry, Constitutional Law Professor 
Brendan Johnson, adjunct Law Professor and former U.S. Attorney for the District of South Dakota.

Former
Thomas Sterling, 1st Dean of the College of Law and U.S. Senator from South Dakota. Namesake of Sterling Honors. 
Bartlett Tripp, 1st Professor of Law, 25th U.S. Ambassador to Austria, last Chief Justice of Dakota Territory Supreme Court, and first president of the South Dakota Bar Association.
Ralph E. Erickson, 5th Dean of the College of Law and 11th Deputy Attorney General of the United States during the Nixon Administration.
Charles Hall Dillon, Professor of Law, U.S. Representative from South Dakota and Associate Justice of the South Dakota Supreme Court. Namesake of the Dillon Lecture Series.
Roger Baron, Professor of Law, ERISA scholar, and counsel in Sereboff v. Mid Atlantic Medical Services, Inc.
Mike Myers, Professor of Law, CEO of Mayo Clinic, and candidate for Governor of South Dakota.

See also
Attorney General of South Dakota
South Dakota Supreme Court
United States Attorney for the District of South Dakota

References

External links
 

Law